Minuscule 123 (in the Gregory-Aland numbering), ε 174 (Von Soden numbering), is a Greek minuscule manuscript of the New Testament on a parchment. Palaeographically it has been assigned to the 11th century. It has complex contents with some marginalia.

Description 

The codex contains a complete text of the four Gospels on 328 thick parchment leaves. The text is written in one column per page, 18 lines per page.

There is also a division according to the smaller Ammonian Sections (in Mark 241 – 16:20), but without references to the Eusebian Canons.

Text 

The Greek text of the codex is a representative of the Byzantine text-type. Hermann von Soden classified it to the textual family Kx. Kurt Aland places it in Category V.

According to the Claremont Profile Method it represents textual family Kx in Luke 1, Luke 10, and Luke 20.

Some corrections were made by another hand.

History 

The manuscript was brought from Constantinople by the ambassador Augier de Busbeck in 1562 (along with Minuscule 221 and 222).

It was examined by Treschow, Alter, Birch. Alter used it in his edition of the Greek text of the New Testament. C. R. Gregory saw it in 1887.

Currently the codex is located at the Austrian National Library (Theol. Gr. 240) at Vienna.

See also 

 List of New Testament minuscules
 Biblical manuscripts

References

Further reading 

 A. G. Busbequii D. legationis Tureicae epistolae quattuor, Hannover 1605, p. 295.

Greek New Testament minuscules
11th-century biblical manuscripts
Biblical manuscripts of the Austrian National Library